ACLEDA Bank Plc. is a public limited company, formed under the Banking and Financial Institutions Law of the Kingdom of Cambodia. Based in Phnom Penh,  with 261 offices covering all provinces, as well as 42 in Laos, and seven in Myanmar. ACLEDA started out in 1993 when it began providing micro credits to war victims. By now it is Cambodia's major commercial bank. ACLEDA had more than $5,244 million in total assets as of December 31, 2017, and more than $3,117 million in deposits, with over $3,085 million in loans outstanding.
According to the National Bank of Cambodia, ACLEDA Bank is the largest domestic commercial bank in terms of total assets and number of clients, with more than 1.7 million depositors as of December 31, 2017.

The bank is headed by president and GMD, In Channy, who is one of the original 28 members of the organization. Channy joined the company in 1992 as a loan officer while the bank was still a UN-funded microfinance project. He now serves as chief executive officer of the company, and also serves as vice-chairman of the International Business Chamber of Cambodia.

ACLEDA is an acronym for the Association of Cambodian Local Economic Development Agencies.

History
With the ILO and UNDP as godparents, ACLEDA was established in January 1993, as a national NGO for micro and small enterprise development and credit by a group of founders listed below. From its earliest days, it enjoyed the support of a number of major international development agencies whose contributions are gratefully acknowledged in ACLEDA's 'Roll of Honour'. Two factors, namely the expansion of its network to cover all of Cambodia's provinces and towns and its ability to operate at a profit to ensure its sustainability, led both its board and international partners to conclude that it should be transformed into a commercial bank. This would not only provide a secure regulatory framework lacking under its previous status but would also enable it to enlarge its range of funding options (e.g., equity injection, taking public deposits, obtaining commercial interbank loans) to support the expansion of its core micro-finance business. With assistance from USAID, MPDF/IFC and UNDP—to name a few—a three-year program for transformation commenced in 1998 which culminated in the granting of a specialized banking license in October 2000.

Under the process, the original NGO has transferred its assets and on-lent its liabilities (long-term loans from donors) to the new ACLEDA Bank. In return, it has received 44.91% of the bank's capital of US$4 million; the ACLEDA Staff Association (‘ASA’), a trust established to give its staff an equity interest, has purchased 6.09% and the remaining 49% has been taken up in equal parts by four foreign investors, namely the International Finance Corporation (a division of the World Bank), DEG (Germany), FMO and Triodos Bank (The Netherlands). It is intended that ACLEDA Bank will seek a listing on a stock exchange at some time in the future.

Since December 1, 2003, ACLEDA Bank was licensed as a commercial bank after having tripled its capital to US$13 million and was named ACLEDA Bank Plc. On November 30, 2006, ACLEDA Bank raised its issued and paid-up capital from US$13 million to US$30 million. On January 4, 2008, ACLEDA Bank celebrated its fifteenth anniversary and raised its issued and paid-up capital from US$30 million to US$50 million.

On January 23, 2009, the capital of ACLEDA Bank Plc. was increased from US$50 million to US$60 million and further increased on June 12, 2009, to US$68.15 million. On June 3, 2011, the bank increased its capital to US$78 million and further increased to US$88 million on February 6, 2012.

On May 25, 2012, ACLEDA Bank had raised its issued and paid-up capital from US$88,372,500 to US$113,169,560. On June 24, 2015, ACLEDA Bank increased its share capital from US$225,535,605 to US$265,726,050.

On June 8, 2016, ACLEDA Bank increased its share capital from $265,726,050 to $307,763,911.

On May 12, 2017, ACLEDA Bank increased its share capital from $307,763,911 to $358,544,956.

International expansion
In 2008, ACLEDA Bank expanded its business to Laos, becoming the first Cambodian bank to begin operations within the country. As of December 31, 2017, ACLEDA manages 42 branches within Laos. Following the lifting of international sanctions on Myanmar in early 2012, the bank applied for a micro-finance license in Myanmar in June of that year with the plan of providing deposit accounts and money transfers via micro-finance services. The Burmese subsidiary was opened in 2013, which manages 7 offices in the Yangon and Bago regions.

ACLEDA Securities PLC.
ACLEDA Securities Plc. is a brokerage firm registered, as a public limited corporation, under the law of the Kingdom of Cambodia, authorized by the National Bank of Cambodia and licensed by the Securities and Exchange Commission of Cambodia (SECC) to provide services as a securities brokerage business to individual and institutional customers, investors and the public.

During the IPO of PPWSA in March 2012, Cambodia's first IPO on the Cambodian Stock Exchange (CSX), ACLEDA Securities provided market access to investors wishing to participate in the stock exchange through 21 of the bank's branches around Cambodia.

Shareholders
ACLEDA Bank Plc. is 51% owned by Cambodian interests, including its staff, with the remaining 49% taken up in equal parts by Sumitomo Mitsui Banking Corporation, COFIBRED (Compagnie Financière de la BRED — a BRED Banque Populaire's fully owned subsidiary), ORIX Corporation, and the three investment funds (Triodos-Doen Foundation, Triodos Fair Share Fund, and Triodos Microfinance Fund) managed by Triodos Investment Management.

Its current shareholders as at June 19, 2019.

ACLEDA Staff Association (ASA)
ASA is a holding company through which the employees of ACLEDA and certain other investors can participate in the long‐term growth and value appreciation of ACLEDA. ASA holds as its principal asset 98,806,034 shares of ACLEDA, which represents 25% of the bank's issued shares. On March 1, 2010, the Leopard Cambodia Fund, Cambodia's first private equity fund operated by frontier markets private equity firm Leopard Capital, in partnership with two other foreign investors, acquired a 7.72% stake in ASA, Plc.

Ratings
ACLEDA Bank is the first bank in Cambodia to have been assigned ratings by the top international credit rating agency — Standard & Poor's.

December 16, 2020

Notes

See also
 ACLEDA Institute of Business

Banks of Cambodia
Microfinance organizations
Banks established in 1993
Privately held companies of Cambodia
Companies based in Phnom Penh
Cambodian brands
Cambodian companies established in 1993